Zaglik-e Sofla (also Romanized as Zaglīk-e Soflá; also known as Zaklak-e Pā'īn) is a village in Owch Hacha Rural District, in the Central District of Ahar County, East Azerbaijan Province, Iran. At the 2006 census, its population was 54, in 15 families.

References 

Populated places in Ahar County